In ancient Rome, a gens ( or , ; plural: gentes ) was a family consisting of individuals who shared the same  nomen and who claimed descent from a common ancestor.  A branch of a gens was called a stirps (plural: stirpes).  The gens was an important social structure at Rome and throughout Italy during the period of the Roman Republic.  Much of individuals' social standing depended on the gens to which they belonged.  Certain gentes were classified as  patrician, others as  plebeian; some had both patrician and plebeian branches. The importance of membership in a gens declined considerably in imperial times, although the gentilicium continued to be used and defined the origins and dynasties of Roman emperors.

Origins
The word gens is sometimes translated as "race", or "nation", meaning a people descended from a common ancestor (rather than sharing a common physical trait).  It can also be translated as "clan", "kin", or "tribe", although the word tribus has a separate and distinct meaning in Roman culture.  A gens could be as small as a single family, or could include hundreds of individuals.  According to tradition, in 479 BC the gens Fabia alone were able to field a militia consisting of three hundred and six men of fighting age.  The concept of the gens was not uniquely Roman, but was shared with communities throughout Italy, including those who spoke Italic languages such as Latin, Oscan, and Umbrian as well as the Etruscans. All of these peoples were eventually absorbed into the sphere of Roman culture.

The oldest gentes were said to have originated before the foundation of Rome (traditionally 753 BC), and claimed descent from mythological personages as far back as the time of the Trojan War (traditionally ended 1184 BC). However, the establishment of the gens cannot long predate the adoption of hereditary surnames.  The nomen gentilicium, or "gentile name", was its distinguishing feature, for a Roman citizen's nomen indicated his membership in a gens.

The nomen could be derived from any number of things, such as the name of an ancestor, a person's occupation, physical appearance, character, or town of origin.  Because some of these things were fairly common, it was possible for unrelated families to bear the same nomen, and over time to become confused.

Persons could be adopted into a gens and acquire its nomen. A libertus, or "freedman", usually assumed the nomen (and sometimes also the praenomen) of the person who had manumitted him, and a naturalized citizen usually took the name of the patron who granted his citizenship. Freedmen and newly enfranchised citizens were not technically part of the gentes whose names they shared, but within a few generations it often became impossible to distinguish their descendants from the original members.  In practice this meant that a gens could acquire new members and even new branches, either by design or by accident.

Stirpes
Different branches or stirpes of a gens were usually distinguished by their cognomina, additional surnames following the nomen, which could be either personal or hereditary.  Some particularly large stirpes themselves became divided into multiple branches, distinguished by additional cognomina.

Praenomina
Most gentes regularly employed a limited number of personal names, or praenomina, the selection of which helped to distinguish members of one gens from another. Sometimes different branches of a gens would vary in their names of choice. The most conservative gentes would sometimes limit themselves to three or four praenomina, while others made regular use of six or seven.

There were two main reasons for this limited selection: first, it was traditional to pass down family names from one generation to the next; such names were always preferred. Second, most patrician families limited themselves to a small number of names as a way of distinguishing themselves from the plebeians, who often employed a wider variety of names, including some that were seldom used by the patricians. However, several of the oldest and most noble patrician houses frequently used rare and unusual praenomina.

Certain families also deliberately avoided particular praenomina. In at least some cases, this was because of traditions concerning disgraced or dishonoured members of the gens bearing a particular name. For example, the gens Junia avoided the praenomina Titus and Tiberius after two members with these names were executed for treason. A similar instance supposedly led the assembly of the gens Manlia to forbid its members from bearing the praenomen Marcus, although this prohibition does not seem to have been strictly observed.

Social function of the gens
In theory, each gens functioned as a state within a state, governed by its own elders and assemblies, following its own customs, and carrying out its own religious rites. Certain cults were traditionally associated with specific gentes.  The gentile assemblies had the responsibility of adoption and guardianship for their members.  If a member of a gens died intestate and without immediate family, his property was distributed to the rest of the gens.

The decisions of a gens were theoretically binding on all of its members.  However, no public enactment is recorded as having been passed by the assembly of a gens.  As a group, the gentes had considerable influence on the development of Roman law and religious practices, but comparatively little influence on the political and constitutional history of Rome.

Patrician and plebeian gentes
Certain gentes were considered patrician, and others plebeian.  According to tradition, the patricians were descended from the "city fathers", or patres; that is, the heads of the family at the time of its foundation by Romulus, the first King of Rome.  Other noble families which came to Rome during the time of the kings were also admitted to the patriciate, including several who emigrated from Alba Longa after that city was destroyed by Tullus Hostilius.  The last known instance of a gens being admitted to the patriciate prior to the 1st century BC was when the Claudii were added to the ranks of the patricians after coming to Rome in 504 BC, five years after the establishment of the Republic.

Numerous sources describe two classes amongst the patrician gentes, known as the gentes maiores, or major gentes, and the gentes minores, or minor gentes.  No definite information has survived concerning which families were numbered amongst the gentes maiores, or even how many there were.  However, they almost certainly included the Aemilii, Claudii, Cornelii, Fabii, Manlii, and Valerii.  Nor is it certain whether this distinction was of any practical importance, although it has been suggested that the princeps senatus, or speaker of the Senate, was usually chosen from their number.

For the first several decades of the Republic, it is not entirely certain which gentes were considered patrician and which plebeian.  However, a series of laws promulgated in 451 and 450 BC as the Twelve Tables attempted to codify a rigid distinction between the classes, formally excluding the plebeians from holding any of the major magistracies from that time until the passage of the Lex Licinia Sextia in 367 BC.  The law forbidding the intermarriage of patricians and plebeians was repealed after only a few years, by the Lex Canuleia in 445 BC.

Despite the formal reconciliation of the orders in 367, the patrician houses, which as time passed represented a smaller and smaller percentage of the Roman populace, continued to hold on to as much power as possible, resulting in frequent conflict between the orders over the next two centuries.  Certain patrician families regularly opposed the sharing of power with the plebeians, while others favoured it, and some were divided.

Many gentes included both patrician and plebeian branches.  These may have arisen through adoption or manumission, or when two unrelated families bearing the same nomen became confused.  It may also be that individual members of a gens voluntarily left or were expelled from the patriciate, along with their descendants.  In some cases, gentes that must originally have been patrician, or which were so regarded during the early Republic, were later known only by their plebeian descendants.

By the first century BC, the practical distinction between the patricians and the plebeians was minimal.  Nonetheless, with the rise of imperial authority, several plebeian gentes were raised to the patriciate, replacing older patrician families that had faded into obscurity, and were no longer represented in the Roman senate.  Although both the concept of the gens and of the patriciate survived well into imperial times, both gradually lost most of their significance.  In the final centuries of the Western Empire, patricius was used primarily as an individual title, rather than a class to which an entire family belonged.

See also
 Genos – a similar concept in Ancient Greece
 Gana – a cognate Sanskrit term referring to a different type of human group
 List of Roman gentes
 List of Roman nomina
 Roman naming conventions

References

External links

Ancient Roman families
 
Social groups